Arcen is a village in the Dutch province of Limburg. In 2010, it became part of the municipality of Venlo. Previously, it had been part of the municipality of Arcen en Velden and the seat of the town hall.

In 2001, Arcen had 1884 inhabitants. The built-up area of the town was 0.39 km2, and contained 747 residences.

In December 2009, the last month before merging with the city of Venlo, the municipality of Arcen en Velden had 8671 inhabitants.

Its location on the river Maas (Meuse) makes it a popular tourist attraction. It is wedged in between Germany in the east and the river Maas in the west. National Park de Hamert lies just north of Arcen. Historic buildings include the 'Schanstoren' (Schans Tower) and the castle as well as century old houses in the village itself. The town hall is of a Traditionalist 20th century design by A.J. Kropholler while the church was designed in a similar style by H.W. Valk. Outside the centre are the Hertog Jan beer brewery and the 'De IJsvogel' distillery, which is located in a historic water mill and produces jenever (gin), bitters and liquors.

Near Arcen lies the only preserved fortress built to protect the Fossa Eugeniana, a canal built between 1625 and 1629 to connect the rivers Rhine and Maas.

Arcen has a thermal bath and various holiday parks.

Arcen's 'Kasteeltuinen' (castle gardens) went bankrupt in 2012.

Arcen is the birthplace of former Dutch soccer international Stan Valckx.

Gallery

Climate

References

External links 

 Castle Gardens

Boroughs of Venlo
Populated places in Limburg (Netherlands)
Spa towns in the Netherlands